Holy Trinity Catholic Church, also known as the Grouping of Religious Buildings at Trinity, is a historic Roman Catholic religious complex located in Wabash Township, Jay County, Indiana.  The complex includes the St. Marys of the Woods Convent (moved, Holy Trinity Catholic Church, rectory, and school.  The convent (now a private dwelling) was built in 1855, and is a two-story building with a large porch located at the corner of Hwy 67 and CR 850 E.  Holy Trinity Catholic Church was built in 1885, and is a Gothic Revival style brick and stone church with a central bell tower with flying buttresses.  The two-story brick rectory and two-story brick school were constructed in 1909.

It was listed on the National Register of Historic Places in 1980.

References

Roman Catholic churches in Indiana
Churches on the National Register of Historic Places in Indiana
Federal architecture in Indiana
Italianate architecture in Indiana
Gothic Revival architecture in Indiana
Churches completed in 1885
Buildings and structures in Jay County, Indiana
National Register of Historic Places in Jay County, Indiana
Italianate church buildings in the United States